The Grande Pointe des Planereuses is a mountain of the Mont Blanc massif, located west of Praz de Fort in the canton of Valais, Switzerland. It lies on the range south of the Saleina Glacier.

References

External links
 Grande Pointe des Planereuses on Hikr

Mountains of the Alps
Alpine three-thousanders
Mountains of Valais
Mountains of Switzerland
Mont Blanc massif